David Asare Bremang (born 21 April 2000) is an English professional footballer who plays as a forward for Hungerford Town.

Club career
Bremang joined Coventry City in 2018 from the London-based Conquest Academy.

On 29 June 2021, Bremang joined Championship side Barnsley for an undisclosed fee. On 5 February 2022, Bremang joined National League North side Guiseley on loan until 3 March 2022.

On 19 August 2022, Bremang joined League Two club Crawley Town for an undisclosed fee.

On 26 January 2023, Bremang's contract with Crawley Town was terminated by mutual consent. Bremang scored one goal in six appearances for the club. 

On 3 February 2023, National League South club Hungerford Town announced Bremang had signed a contract until the end of the season.

Personal life
Born in England, Bremang is of Ghanaian descent.

Career statistics

Club
.

Notes

References

2000 births
Living people
Footballers from Hammersmith
Footballers from Greater London
English footballers
English people of Ghanaian descent
Association football forwards
National League (English football) players
English Football League players
Southern Football League players
Coventry City F.C. players
Nuneaton Borough F.C. players
Leamington F.C. players
Barnsley F.C. players
Guiseley A.F.C. players
Black British sportsmen
Crawley Town F.C. players